Vigo is a city and municipality in the province of Pontevedra, within the autonomous community of Galicia, Spain. Located in the northwest of the Iberian Peninsula, it sits on the southern shore of an inlet of the Atlantic Ocean, the Ria de Vigo, the southernmost of the Rías Baixas.

The area of the municipality includes the Cíes Islands, part of the Atlantic Islands of Galicia National Park.

Vigo is one of the region's primary economic agents, owing to the French Stellantis Vigo Plant and to its port. Close to the Portugal–Spain border, Vigo is part of the Galicia–North Portugal Euroregion. The European Fisheries Control Agency is headquartered in Vigo.

History
In the Early Middle Ages, the small village of Vigo was part of the territory of Galician-speaking neighbouring towns, particularly Tui, and suffered several Viking attacks. However, its number of inhabitants was so small that, historically, it was not considered a real villa until around the 15th century, when the earliest records began.

In the 16th and 17th centuries, the city was attacked several times. In 1585 and 1589, during an unsuccessful attack by the English counter-Armada, Francis Drake raided the city and temporarily occupied it, burning many buildings. Several decades later a Turkish fleet tried to attack the city. As a result, the city's walls were built in 1656 in the reign of Philip IV of Spain. They are still partially preserved.

At this time, and in spite of the attacks, Vigo developed its earliest commerce and was given several privileges by the kings of Spain.

In 1702, the Battle of Vigo Bay occurred, and in 1719, because a Spanish fleet which departed from Vigo attempted to invade Scotland in support of the Jacobites, the city was occupied for ten days by a British force.

In 1808, the French Army annexed Spain to the Napoleonic Empire, although Vigo remained unconquered until January, 1809. Vigo was also the first city of Galicia to be freed from French rule, in what is annually celebrated on March 28 as the Reconquista (reconquest from the French in the context of the Peninsular War). In 1833, the city of Pontevedra was designated the provincial capital of the province of Pontevedra, within which lies Vigo.

Vigo grew very rapidly in the 20th century, thanks to the fact that the Franco government granted it a tax-free zone in 1947 allowing companies to be set up there for free, as well as an Industrial Development Pole in 1964, a very unusual case for a non-capital of a Spanish province. Continuous urban-planning changes left Vigo less structured than other Galician cities such as Pontevedra and A Coruña.

Toponym

Vigo's urban area is built on both a hill-fort (Castro) and a Roman settlement. It is generally accepted that the name Vigo is derived from the Latin word vicus spacorum, meaning "small village".

Vigo has been given the nickname cidade olívica (city of olives). It is said that, after the conflict between Isabel de Castilla and Juana la Beltraneja - where Galician nobility fought for the latter - the victor ordered all of Galicia's olive trees to be cut down, as they symbolized peace. The tree in Vigo however, couldn't be uprooted as it was planted in sacred ground. The tree is represented in the city seal, and a descendant of it is still alive in Vigo's city centre.

Geography

Location 
To the northeast, Vigo borders the municipality of Redondela; to the east, Mos; to the south, O Porriño and Gondomar; and to the southwest, Nigrán. On the other side of the bay are the municipalities of Cangas and Moaña.

Climate

Vigo has a transitional climate between the oceanic climate "Cfb" and the warm-summer Mediterranean climate "Csb" according to the Köppen climate classification. Although Vigo is the rainiest city in Galicia, with its noticeable drying trend in the summer, Vigo's climate is more similar to the variant of the oceanic climate commonly seen in the Pacific Northwest region of North America. Compared to many other Galician towns, Vigo and Pontevedra experience warmer summer temperatures than A Coruña or Santiago de Compostela and milder winters than inland areas. This is due to its sheltered location, surrounded by mountains and the Illas Cíes out in the bay towards the sea. The all-time record high for the city is  set on August 7, 2016. Vigo is known for its extreme rainfall in winter. December 1978 saw  fall at the weather station in a single month. During that month on 7th December,  fell on a single day. Normal values for 1981-2010 was  falling on just 129.2 days indicating heavy rain to be common. The airport where values are taken is located further inland at a considerably higher elevation than the city itself located at the coastline in the Ria de Vigo estuary, which is likely warmer year-round.

Demographics

The municipality of Vigo had 293,642 inhabitants in 2018 (198,537 in the city) with an extended metropolitan population of 478,508, in the southern part of the province of Pontevedra making it Spain's 14th-largest metropolitan area.

In 2020 - according to the data provided by the INE on 1 January 2020 - it had a population of 482,858 inhabitants in total, of which 296,692 lived in the municipality of Vigo, which represented 61.44% of the total population of the metropolitan area.In 2019, 15,319 foreigners lived in the city, 5.2% of the total population. The main nationalities are Portuguese (12%), Venezuelans (9.2%), Brazilians (9%), Romanians (7.5%), Colombians (6.5%), Senegalese (4%) and Chinese people (3%).

By language, according to 2013 data, 7.68% of the population spoke exclusively in Galician, and 51.39% in Spanish; 11.38% spoke in Galician more often than Spanish, and 29.55% more often in Spanish than Galician. This made Vigo the least Galician-speaking city in Galicia.

The creation of Vigo Metropolitan Area was approved in 2016 and, in addition to Vigo, it originally accounted for the following 13 municipalities: Baiona, Cangas, Fornelos de Montes, Gondomar, Moaña, Mos, Nigrán, Pazos de Borbén, O Porriño, Redondela, Salceda de Caselas, Salvaterra de Miño and Soutomaior. It has been however suspended since its creation. The European Union's Directorate-General for Regional and Urban Policy assigns Vigo a wider functional urban area (FUA), with 21 municipalities and a population of 541,000 inhabitants.

Government and administration 

Vigo is a municipality, the basic level of local government in Spain. The Ayuntamiento (concello in Galician) is the body charged with the municipal government and administration. The Plenary of the concello is formed by 27 elected municipal councillors, who in turn invest the mayor.

The last municipal election took place on 26 May 2019, leading to a plenary formed by 20 councillors from the Socialists' Party of Galicia–PSOE, 4 from the People's Party, 2 from the Marea de Vigo and 1 from the Galician Nationalist Bloc. The current mayor is Abel Caballero (Spanish Socialist Workers Party), who has won four mandates in a row since becoming mayor in 2007.

Parishes
Vigo is administratively divided into 23 parroquias ("parishes").

 Alcabre: Ameixeira, Barreiro, Carregal, Castañal, Cristo, Forte, Gándara, Igrexa, Pardaíña, Roade, Sobreira, Viñagrande
 Beade: Babio, Balde, Carballo do Pazo, Coutada, Gándara, Porto, A Pena, Quintián, O Seixo, A Venda, Sáa
 Bembrive: Baruxans, Carballal, Chans, Xestoso, Mosteiro, Outeiro, San Cibrán, Segade, Areeiro, Eifonso, Mouteira, Recaré, Xesteira
 Bouzas
 Cabral: Becerreira, Carballal, Sello, Figueiras
 Candeán: Igrexa, Candeán de Arriba, Rabadeira, Fonte Oscura
 Castrelos: Alvite, Castreliños, Costa, Chantada, Espedrigada o Pereiró, A Pousa, Falcoa, Macal, Pazó, Portoloureiro, Viloura
 Coia
 Comesaña: Casas, Cocheiros, Comesaña, Eidos, Igrexa, Muíños, Pazo, Pedra Branca, Pedreira, Pereiras, Ponte, Romeu, Rodeira, Sanin, Tombo, Viña da Veiga
 Coruxo: Roteas, Río, Molans, Cean, Fontela, Breadouro, Silveira, Combro, Calzada, Cotarelo, Romeu, Verdeal, Melcas, Taberna, Burdes, Abade, Igrexa, Quintas, Carballal, Rozo, Coto de Arriba, Coto de Abaixo, Carrasqueira, Muiños, Gándara, Longra, Luz, Bouzas, Tarrío, Gato, San Lourenzo, Torre de Abaixo, Torre de Arriba, Laxes, Viño, Pedreira, Parrocha, Fragoselo, Tintureira
 Freixeiro: Mantelas, A Salgueira, Riobó
 Lavadores: Arriero, A Bagunda, Barreiro, Cambeses, A Ceboleira, O Couto, Gandariña, Gandarón, Naia, Pardavila, Riomaio, San Paio de Abaixo, San Paio, Igrexa
 Matamá: Balsa, Balvis, Barxa, Beirán, Campos, Carapuxa, Carneiras, Dehesa, Castro, Igrexa, Lagarella, Moo, Outeiro, Parada, Pazos, Pereiro, Revolta, Rivas, Ribelas, Roupeiro, San Amaro, Vilar
 Navia: Devesa, Gándara, Goberna, Pereiras, Quintela, Redondo, Samil, Tomada, Torre, Xuncal
 Oia: Bouzo, Cabo Estai, Canido Praia, Carretera Cortada, Cerqueiro, Cruceiro, Curras, Eiras, Estea, Esteriz, Estomada, Figueiras, Gontade, Grades, Hermida, Igrexa, Loureiro, Estación, Lantexa, Lavandeira, Liñares, A Maris, Matoca, Mide, Oia, Outeiro, Poza, Rochas, Rozo, Senra de Arriba, Senra de Abaixo, Silval, Toxal, Toucido, Verdella, Xistro
 Saiáns: Carballido, Cal do Outeiro, Garcias, Aral, Fontán, Gándara, Cova da Becha, Curbeira, Horta, Orxas, Castañal, Borreiros, Portiño, Tomada, San Xurxo, Capela, Misarelas, Estea, Pinal, Budiases, Souto, Cova da Barxa, Domeira, Cachoa, Dovesa, Fortiñon, Gondufe, Volta, Vilaverde
 San Paio
 San Xoán do Monte
 Sárdoma
 Teis: Cacharela, Mouta, Ferreira, Paradela, Fervenza, Ríos, Travesán, Presa, Chumba, Igrexa, Trapa, Arnel, Praixal, Rorís, Balbarda, A Guía, Oliveira, Espiñeiro, Frian, Santa Tegra, Bellavista, Calzada, Coutadas, Os Caños, Tovel, A Rabuda, Guixar, Barrio das Frores, Montecelo
 Valadares
 Vigo centro
 Zamáns: Casal de Abade, Cidáns, A Igrexa (San Mamede), As Lagoas, Marcosende, A Menda, Paredes, Vilariño, Vilaverde, Erville.

Main sights

An industrial and recent city, Vigo has few remarkable old buildings but is home to the Co-Cathedral of Santa María and several museums, most of which were inaugurated between the late 1990s and early 2000s. Among them are the Museum of Contemporary Art (MARCO) and the Museum of the Sea. The oldest museum is the Quiñones de León Municipal Museum. The most important historic centre of the region is located in its capital and rival city, Pontevedra.

 Casco Vello (historic centre)
 Porta do Sol, Policarpo Sanz and Alameda area (modern centre)
 Príncipe and Urzaiz Streets (commercial area)
 Celtic Castro ruins
 Castro fortress
 Collegiate church of Santa Maria de Vigo

Museums
 Naturnova Museum: Museum dedicated to the environment. Interactive contents.
 Museum of the Sea: Museum dedicated to the Sea, and to tinned food and to naval. Important building designed by famous architects Aldo Rossi and Cesar Portela.
 Museum of Contemporary Art, Vigo: One of the most important museums of Contemporary Art in Spain.
 Museum of Castrelos.
 Verbum, Casa das Palabras. A museum dedicated to languages and communication. Important building designed by famous architect Cesar Portela.
Pinacoteca de Vigo
 Galician Center of Photography
 Ethnographic Museum Liste
 Pedro Barrié de la Maza Foundation

Romanesque architecture of Vigo

The municipality of Vigo is not only one of the major industrial cities in Galicia, but it is also one of the more important Roman centers of Pontevedra. Although within the city one will not find much Romanesque architecture, it can be seen a few kilometers away from the city center. In many of the municipality's neighborhoods and parishes a large number of Roman ruins remain. Such is the importance of the Roman remains in Vigo that many Spanish authors have come to coin the term Romanesque Vigo (románico vigués in Spanish). Vigo retains some interesting examples of Romanesque churches in southern Galicia: 
 Santa María de Castrelos
 Santiago de Bembrive
 San Salvador de Coruxo

Beaches
Throughout the municipality of Vigo there are 47 coves and beaches, including sandy areas with waves for water sports, wild coves, family beaches, nudist beaches and urban beaches. Some of these coves and beaches have various facilities or services for their users, such as sports areas, showers, footbaths, public address system, promenade, Red Cross lifeguard and rescue post, areas adapted for people with disabilities, etc.

In June 2020, the Association for Environmental and Consumer Education (ADEAC) awarded the blue flag distinction to the following 10 beaches in Vigo: Argazada, Canido, Carril, Fontaíña, Muíños de Fortiñón, Punta, Rodas, Samil, Tombo do Gato and Vao.

Transport

Airport

Vigo is served by Vigo-Peinador Airport (VGO/LEVX). Located 12 kilometres to the east of the city of Vigo, straddling halfway the municipalities of Vigo, Redondela and Mos, it offers 7 domestic destinations.

Ferry
A ferry service operates between the Port of Vigo and the towns of Cangas and Moaña as well as the Cíes Islands, 15 kilometres away from the city, part of the Atlantic Islands of Galicia National Park, the only National Park in Galicia, which includes Ons Island in the Pontevedra Bay.

Rail transport
The Urzáiz and Guixar railway stations serve Vigo, allowing direct connections to the rest of Galicia as well as to Porto across the border in Portugal.

Road 
European route E01 goes through the town. This highway goes south through Lisbon and north to the A Coruña area.

The A-52 road goes inland, east to Ourense and Madrid from O Porriño. A branch of the AP-9 Motorway connects Vigo to Portugal in the south and with Pontevedra, Santiago de Compostela, A Coruña and Ferrol in the north.

Public transport
Urban transport is provided by buses by Vitrasa Transportation.

Economy

Vigo is characterized by a diversified economy linked to the fishing sector, industry, trade, tourism and services. It is often considered with A Coruña one of the economic and industrial engines of Galicia.

Fishing sector 
Vigo is the home port of many of the world's largest fishing companies, such as Pescanova and Iberconsa and the most important centre of the Galician canned and processed fish industries.

The fishing sector in Vigo generates more than 32,000 direct and indirect jobs and a turnover of more than 1 billion euros per year. More than 660 fishing vessels are registered in the port of Vigo, making it one of the main ports for the marketing of fresh fish for human consumption in the world, with around 800,000 tonnes per year.

Vigo regularly hosts congresses and trade fairs related to industrial fishing, such as the World Tuna Conference (biannually), Conxemar (annually), or the World Fishing Exhibition (which was held periodically from 1973 to 2009).

Vigo is home of the European Fisheries Control Agency.

Industry 
Vigo is one of the leading industrial areas in Galicia, with a car factory, shipyards, and auxiliary industry in both automotive and marine sectors. Situated in Vigo since 1958, the Stellantis Plant is one of the largest employers in the region. In 2007, it produced a total of 545,000 vehicles, of which more than 82% were sold outside Spain. Biotech and other advanced industries play an important role on Vigo's economy.

The publishing industry in Galician is prominent in the city, with Editorial Galaxia and Editorial Xerais.

Port of Vigo 
The Port of Vigo covers a length of more than 20 km and offers more than 9 km of docks. The largest port traffic is general freight, highlighting container traffic, RO-RO of vehicles (the second in Spain in Ro-Ro traffic for new vehicles), natural stone and granite (the first of Spain in granite traffic), wood and preserved food.

Education
The main campus of the University of Vigo is located on top of one of the mountains that surrounds the town, in the parish of Zamáns. The local transportation service Vitrasa enables shuttles in order to communicate the campus with the town. The majority of the students of the university come from Vigo itself and from other towns and villages in Galicia and can choose from a wide range of studies, with a focus on ocean studies and engineering.

The University of Vigo was founded in 1990 as split from the University of Santiago de Compostela and has two additional campuses located in Pontevedra and Ourense. The Zamáns Campus features several buildings that constitute excellent examples of modern architecture that blends in with the shape of the mountain in which it is located. These buildings were projected by the likes of Enric Miralles, Alfonso Penelas, Pilar Díez y Alberto Noguerol César Portela, Gabriel Santos Zas and César Padrón.

Culture

Language
Vigo has two official languages: Galician and Spanish, the latter being the most used nowadays.

Music
A movida viguesa was a hedonistic cultural movement akin to the Movida madrileña that took place in Vigo during the 1980s triggered by the explosion of liberties after the death of dictator Francisco Franco. The most important artists of this postmodern movement were musicians; particularly punk and new wave bands such as Siniestro Total, Golpes Bajos, Aerolíneas Federales, Semen Up or Os Resentidos.

At the moment, the city still has notorious bands like Iván Ferreiro (ex-singer of Los Piratas) and Mon.

Media and entertainment

Vigo has two daily newspapers; the Faro de Vigo, the oldest newspaper in Spain still in circulation, and the Atlántico Diario, a little local newspaper. There also exist a local edition of the Galician main headline newspaper "La Voz de Galicia". Vigo was also the main location of historic newspaper such as the weekly newspaper "A Nosa Terra", which was published in Galician and is now defunct.

Vigo also has a TV local station: "Televigo". Although not very popular, it is known thanks to the town mayor, Abel Caballero, who has a show in which he answers to questions and inquiries submitted by the citizens.

Radio coverage includes RNE —the Spanish public radio network—, Radio Galega —a Galician government-supported radio in Galician language—, and some private-owned stations ("Radio Vigo - Cadena Ser", "Radio Voz Vigo", "Radio ECCA", and so on).

Around the 2000s, several online news websites emerged (for example, "riadevigo.com") besides of the traditional media homepages. Vigo also participated in the Europeanwide free newspapers rush led by "Metro" and some free journals were published in the 1990s and 2000s: "20 minutos", "Gaceta Universitaria", "Redacción Xove", etcetera. "España Exterior" is also printed in Vigo.

The locally produced award-winning feature movie Mondays In The Sun (original title Los lunes al sol) depicts the life of several men who have lost their work at the Port of Vigo. This film is not based on a single individual's experiences but on the perceived collective experiences of many local port workers.

Sports

Vigo has one of the most important women's basketball team in Spain, Celta, more commonly referred to today by its sponsorship name of Celta Indepo. They usually compete in the top league of women's basketball, having won the championship three times. For the season 2012–2013, and following a number of economic problems, the team will play in the Spanish women basketball second division.

Vigo has a football team, Real Club Celta de Vigo, which (as of 2019–20) plays in La Liga. The women's team from the area, Federación Viguesa de Peñas Recreativas El Olivo, was the first team from Galicia to compete in the Women's Primera División.

The Rías Baixas offer an excellent environment for nautical sports. Institutions such as the Real Club Nautico de Vigo (RCNV), founded in 1906, and the Liceo Marítimo de Bouzas (LMB), founded in 1907, are good examples of promotion of the nautical sports, especially sailing.

The RCNV organises important events like Atlantic Week, which in September 2006 included the World Championship of the Platu 25 class. Every August, the RCNV also organises one of the largest sailboat races in the Iberian peninsula: the Regata Rías Baixas. In 2006 more than 130 different boats participated.

The Liceo Maritimo de Bouzas (LMB) is a yacht club which counts around 400 associates. The LMB has a long and intense history of sailing and recreational fishing. The LMB organizes two important regattas in the Galician sailing calendar: the Regata Vila de Bouzas and a Regata de Solitarios y a Dos.

The Regata Vila de Bouzas honours the neighbourhood where the LMB is located. The Regata de Solitarios y a Dos is for crews of one and two members. It is a difficult race with two stages; the first consists of a race through the coastal bay of Vigo while the second stage is a longer race around the Cies Islands (and/or Ons Islands).

Notable people
 Amparo Alonso Betanzos, Spanish computer scientist 
 Dores André, ballet dancer
José María de Azcárate, art historian, author, researcher, curator, and professor, specializing in medieval Castilian art and Renaissance sculpture. Born in Vigo.
Antonio M. Pérez, CEO of Eastman Kodak
 Carlos Núñez, musician
 Méndez Núñez, military officer
 Concepcion Picciotto, peace activist
 Francisco Marcó del Pont, last governor of Chile under Spanish rule
 Iago Falque, footballer
 Iván Ferreiro, singer-songwriter
 Rosario Hernández Diéguez, newspaper hawker and trade unionist
 Manuel Manquiña, actor
 Martín Codax, poet
 Domingo Villar, author
 Ramón Souto, composer
 Ricardo Mella, anarchist activist
  Ignacio Ramonet Miguez, journalist and activist, editor-in-chief of Le Monde Diplomatique (1991-2008)
 Roberto Losada Rodríguez, footballer
 Serafín Avendaño, painter
Manuel Porzner, cyclist
Manuela Velasco, actress

In popular culture
Vigo Bay is one of the settings for Jules Verne's novel Twenty Thousand Leagues Under the Sea. The book's protagonist, Captain Nemo, draws his wealth and the funding for his submarine Nautilus from the cargoes of the galleons sunk by the British during the Battle of Vigo Bay in 1702. They are depicted as still having their treasure and as being easily accessible to divers.
In the novel and the movie Das Boot, set during World War II, the German submarine U-96 stops in Vigo under cover of darkness to resupply (in secret, as Spain is neutral) from a German cargo ship stationed there for this purpose.

Twin towns and sister cities

Vigo is twinned with:
 1983 — Lorient, France
 1984 — Narsaq, Greenland
 1986 — Porto, Portugal
 1992 — Buenos Aires, Argentina
 Victoria de Durango, Mexico
 Caracas, Venezuela
 Las Palmas de Gran Canaria, Spain
 Qingdao, China
 Celaya, Mexico

See also
 Garcia Barbon Theatre

References

External links

 Official city site
 Info about Vigo at Spanish Tourism Board Official Website

 
Jules Verne
Municipalities in the Province of Pontevedra
Populated coastal places in Spain
Port cities and towns on the Spanish Atlantic coast